Gustav Eduard Engel (29 October 1823 – 19 July 1895) was a German tenor, music theorician, Music educator and music journalist.

Life 
Born in Königsberg, after attending grammar school in Gdansk, Engel studied philology at the Humboldt University of Berlin and was awarded a doctorate in 1847. He went afterwards to the Evangelisches Gymnasium zum Grauen Kloster in Berlin as a probationary teacher.
 
He already learned to play the piano in Gdansk and also listened to lectures on music during his studies in Berlin. After completing his probationary year as a teacher, he turned increasingly to the study of music theory. In 1863, he started to teach voice at Theodor Kullak's Neue Akademie der Tonkunst and in 1874 he was appointed professor at the Universität der Künste Berlin.

In addition, Engel wrote several works on music theory and music education.

Engel died in Berlin at the age of 76.

 Further reading 
 Hugo Riemann: Musik-Lexikon. 7th edition. Max Hesse Verlag, Leipzig 1909, 
 Hermann Mendel and August Reissmann (eds.): Musikalisches Conversations-Lexikon:  Eine Encyklopädie der gesammten musikalischen Wissenschaften.'' Third volume, Robert Oppenheim, Berlin 1873,

References

External links 
 

German tenors
German music theorists
German music educators
Music journalists
1823 births
1895 deaths
Musicians from Königsberg
19th-century German male opera singers
19th-century German musicologists